Alexander Demin (born 23 September 1988, Rostov-on-Don) is a Russian political figure and a deputy of the 8th State Duma.
 
From 2006 to 2009, Demin worked as an educator in the children's health camp Beryozka. From 2009 to 2010, he served at the Russian Space Forces. In 2012, he also worked as a counsellor at the Orlyonok. In 2020, he joined the New People party. Since September 2021, he has served as deputy of the 8th State Duma.

References
 

 

1988 births
Living people
New People politicians
21st-century Russian politicians
Eighth convocation members of the State Duma (Russian Federation)
Politicians from Rostov-on-Don